Boljevac is a town and municipality located in the Zaječar District of eastern Serbia. According to 2011 census, the population of the town is 3,332, while population of the municipality is 12,865.

History
From 1929 to 1941, Boljevac was part of the Morava Banovina of the Kingdom of Yugoslavia.

In 2010, the Commission on Concealed Mass Graves in Serbia discovered a mass grave of people killed by Yugoslav Partisans during World War II in the settlement of Zmijanac. Partisan troops took over the municipality in October 1944. They subsequently executed over 40 locals, including a priest of the Serbian Orthodox Church.

Settlements
Aside from the town of Boljevac, the municipality of consists of the following villages:

Demographics
As of 2011, the municipality has 12,865 inhabitants. Of those, there are 10,504 (66.28%) Serbs, 4,162 (26.26%) "Vlachs" (Romanians), 229 (1.45%) Romani and other. Boban Marjanovic was born here.

Economy
The following table gives a preview of total number of employed people per their core activity (as of 2017):

Twin cities
  Kavadarci, North Macedonia

References

External links 

 

Populated places in Zaječar District
Timok Valley
Municipalities and cities of Southern and Eastern Serbia
Romanian communities in Serbia